Rutja Airfield is a disused airfield in Estonia, located  west of Kunda.  During the Soviet era it was reserve airfield of the 656th Fighter Aviation Regiment, stationed at Tapa air base.

References

RussianAirFields.com

Defunct airports in Estonia
Haljala Parish
Soviet Air Force bases
Buildings and structures in Lääne-Viru County